Simon Thelwall may refer to:
Simon Thelwall (MP died 1659) (1601–1659),  English politician, MP for Denbigh, 1640
Simon Thelwall (MP died 1586) (1525/26–1586), MP for Denbigh Boroughs and Denbighshire, 1553 et seq
Simon Thelwall (of Cefn Coch) (1561–?), MP for Denbigh Boroughs, 1593
Simon Thelwall (MP died 1663) (1580–1663), MP for Denbighshire 1614, High Sheriff of Denbighshire, 1611